Bluewater is a town and coastal suburb in the City of Townsville, Queensland, Australia. In the  the suburb of Bluewater had a population of 1,040 people.

The coastal town of Bluewater Beach is also within the suburb.

Geography 

As its name suggests, the town of Bluewater Beach is on the coast of the Coral Sea, while the town of Bluewater is inland on the Bruce Highway, which passes from south-east to the north-west through the locality.

The suburb is popular with residents who prefer larger lot sizes and is home to a number of properties with hobby farms and horse agistment. It is also home to solar farms.

History 

Bluewater is situated in the traditional Nyawigi Aboriginal country. The origin of the suburb name Bluewater is from the adjacent Bluewater Creek that was shown on a district map from 1886.

Bluewater was settled in the late nineteenth century, and was close to the Purono rail siding, constructed in 1919 on the extension of the North Coast railway line from Townsville to Ingham.  During World War II, Bluewater became campground to a number of service personnel whose responsibility it was to resist Japanese invasion.

It was not until 1946 that land was first subdivided along Bluewater Beach, followed by subdivisions of Toolakea Beach and the Bluewater Township in the 1950s.

Bluewater Provisional School opened on 3 June 1957.In 1958 it was renamed Bluewater Creek Provisional School. In 1959 it became Bluewater Creek State School. In 1960 it was renamed Bluewater State School.

Bluewater Post Office opened by May 1960.

In the  the suburb of Bluewater had a population of 1,040 people.

The community was badly flooded on 31 January 2019. The wet weather and consequent flooding was expected to continue for another week.

Education 

Bluewater State School is a government primary (Prep-6) school for boys and girls at Buckby Street. In 2018, the school had an enrolment of 438 students with 32 teachers (30 full-time equivalent) and 22 non-teaching staff (12 full-time equivalent).

There is no secondary school in Bluewater. The nearest government secondary school is Northern Beaches State High School in Deeragun to the south-east.

Amenities 

Bluewater is a thriving community containing a number of amenities.

The Townsville City Council operate a mobile library service which visits the Community Centre at Bluewater on Monday afternoons.

Toolakea and Bluewater Beach are popular recreational areas, and there is a boat ramp facility and waste transfer station towards the end of Bluewater Drive.

There is the Urban Forest and Fitness Trail. 

Other amenities in the area include a community centre, a Girl Guides training and camping centre, a Scout hall and Bluewater Medical Practice.

Attractions 
Bluewater Park is a popular tourist destination with designated free campsites.

References

External links

 
 

Suburbs of Townsville
Queensland in World War II